Yortanlı Dam is a dam in Izmir Province, Turkey. The development was backed by the Turkish State Hydraulic Works. In 2010, it was announced that the dam will flood an ancient city of Allianoi.

See also
Allianoi
List of dams and reservoirs in Turkey

References

DSI directory, State Hydraulic Works (Turkey), Retrieved December 16, 2009

Dams in İzmir Province